Philippines v. China (PCA case number 2013–19), also known as the South China Sea Arbitration, was an arbitration case brought by the Republic of the Philippines against the People's Republic of China (PRC) under Annex VII of the United Nations Convention on the Law of the Sea (UNCLOS, ratified by the Philippines in 1984 and by the PRC in 1996) concerning certain issues in the South China Sea, including the nine-dash line introduced by the Republic of China (Taiwan) since as early as 1947. A tribunal of arbitrators appointed the Permanent Court of Arbitration (PCA) as the registry for the proceedings.

On 19 February 2013, China declared that it would not participate in the arbitration. On 7 December 2014, it published a white paper to elaborate its position that, among other points, the tribunal lacks jurisdiction. In accordance with Article 3 of Annex VII of UNCLOS, the Philippines appointed 1 of the 5 arbitrators, while China did not appoint any. On 29 October 2015, the tribunal concluded that it had jurisdiction to consider seven of the Philippines' submissions, subject to certain conditions, and postponed the consideration of its jurisdiction on the other eight submissions to the merits phase.

On 12 July 2016, the arbitral tribunal ruled in favor of the Philippines on most of its submissions. It clarified that while it would not "rule on any question of sovereignty ... and would not delimit any maritime boundary", China's historic rights claims over maritime areas (as opposed to land masses and territorial waters) within the "nine-dash line" have no lawful effect unless entitled to under UNCLOS. China has rejected the ruling, as has Taiwan. Eight governments have called for the ruling to be respected, 35 issued generally positive statements noting the verdict but not called for compliance, and eight rejected it. The United Nations itself "doesn't have a position on the legal and procedural merits of the case or on the disputed claims", and on 12 July the Secretary-General "expressed his hope that the continued consultations on a Code of Conduct between ASEAN and China under the framework of the Declaration of the Conduct of Parties in the South China Sea will lead to increased mutual understanding among all the parties."

Background 

The dispute has been affected by the fact that after Japan renounced all claims to the Spratly Islands and other conquered islands and territories in the Treaty of San Francisco and Treaty of Peace with the Republic of China (Taiwan) signed on 8 September 1951, it did not indicate successor states since China was not invited to the treaty talks held in San Francisco. In reaction to that, on 15 August, the Chinese government issued the Declaration on the Draft Peace Treaty with Japan by the US and the UK and on the San Francisco Conference by the then Foreign Minister Zhou Enlai, reiterating China's sovereignty over the archipelagos in the South China Sea, including the Spratly Islands, and protesting about the absence of any provisions in the draft on who shall take over the South China Sea islands following Japan's renouncement of all rights, title and claim to them. It reiterated that "the Chinese government of the day had taken over those islands" and that the PRC's rightful sovereignty "shall remain intact".

On 28 April 1952, the United States presided over the signing of the Treaty of Peace between Japan and the Republic of China. Article 2 of the document provided that "It is recognized that under Article 2 of the Treaty of Peace which Japan signed at the city of San Francisco on 8 September 1951 (hereinafter referred to as the San Francisco Treaty), Japan has renounced all right, title, and claim to Taiwan (Formosa) and Penghu (the Pescadores) as well as the Spratly Islands and the Paracel Islands."

The Philippines bases its claim on its geographical proximity to the Spratly Islands.

In May 1956, the dispute escalated after Filipino national Tomas Cloma and his followers settled on the islands and declared the territory as "Freedomland", now known as Kalayaan for himself and later requested to make the territory a protectorate of the Philippines. Tomas Cloma even stole China (ROC)'s national flag from the Taiping Island. In July 1956, he apologised officially for his act and he surrendered the flag he stole to China's embassy in Manila. On 2 October 1956, he wrote a letter and ensured he would not make further training voyages or landings in the territorial waters of China (ROC).

Philippine troops were sent to three of the islands in 1968, when the Philippines were under President Ferdinand Marcos. In the 1970s, some countries began to occupy islands and reefs in the Spratlys. The Spratlys were placed under the jurisdiction of the province of Palawan in 1978.

The PRC claims it is entitled to the Paracel and Spratly Islands because they were seen as integral parts of the Ming dynasty. China and Taiwan have these same territorial claims. The Republic of China (Taiwan) took control of the largest island – Taiping Island – in the group since 1946.

Vietnam states that the islands have belonged to it since the 17th century, using historical documents of ownership as evidence. Hanoi began to occupy the westernmost islands during this period.

In the early 1970s, Malaysia joined the dispute by claiming the islands nearest to it.

Brunei also extended its exclusive economic zone, claiming Louisa Reef.

Optional exceptions to applicability of compulsory procedure
Article 298 of Section 3 of Part XV of the Convention provides optional exceptions to the applicability of compulsory procedures provided in Section 2. China made a declaration in 2006 in accordance with this provision of the Convention purporting not to accept any of the procedures provided for in section 2 of Part XV of the convention. Many countries including the United Kingdom, Australia, Italy, France, Canada, and Spain had made similar declarations to reject any of the procedures provided for in sections 2 of Part XV of the convention with respect to the different categories of disputes. However, the Tribunal held that this dispute did not fall within the exceptions provided in Article 298, and was therefore admissible.

Participants
The arbitration involved the Philippines and China.

Filipino stance
The Philippines contended that the "nine-dotted line" claim by China is invalid because it violates the UNCLOS agreements about exclusive economic zones and territorial seas. It says that because most of the features in the South China Sea, such as most of the Spratly Islands, cannot sustain life, they cannot be given their own continental shelf as defined in the convention.

 Agent: Office of the Solicitor General of the Philippines
 Counsel and Advocates 
 Paul S. Reichler, Lawrence H. Martin and Andrew B. Loewenstein of Foley Hoag
 Professor Bernard H. Oxman of University of Miami School of Law
 Professor Philippe Sands QC of Matrix Chambers
 Professor Alan Boyle of Essex Court Chambers

Chinese stance 
China refused to participate in the arbitration, stating that several treaties with the Philippines stipulate that bilateral negotiations be used to resolve border disputes. It also accuses the Philippines of violating the voluntary Declaration on the Conduct of Parties in the South China Sea, made in 2002 between ASEAN and China, which also stipulated bilateral negotiations as the means of resolving border and other disputes. China issued a position paper in December 2014 arguing the dispute was not subject to arbitration because it was ultimately a matter of sovereignty, not exploitation rights. China also cites the fact that it excluded itself from the compulsory arbitration provisions when it ratified UNCLOS. Its refusal did not prevent the arbitral tribunal from proceeding with the case. After the award ruling, the PRC issued a statement rejecting it as 'null' and having decided not to abide by the arbitral tribunal's decision, said it will "ignore the ruling".

Claimants of the South China Sea

Taiwanese stance 
Taiwan, which currently administers Taiping Island, the largest of the Spratly Islands, was neither consulted nor invited to the arbitration. The Philippines claimed Taiping is a rock. In response, Ma Ying-jeou, President of the Republic of China (Taiwan), rejected it as "patently false". Taipei argues that Taiping can sustain human habitation with its freshwater wells and produce, and is thus an island under UNCLOS. It had invited the Philippines and five arbitrators to visit Taiping; the Philippines rejected the invitation, and there was no response from the arbitrators. After the tribunal classified Taiping as a rock, the Presidential Office of Taiwan rejected the ruling, saying it is "not legally binding on the ROC". Legislators from the ruling and opposition parties also joined in to express their disapprovals. Taiwan's Fisheries Agency reaffirmed that its fishermen could continue to operate in the waters surrounding Taiping. The coast guard had already deployed a vessel to the island/rock, and a naval frigate mission was scheduled in response to the ruling.

Vietnamese stance 
On 11 December 2014, Vietnam filed a statement to the tribunal which put forward three points: 1) Vietnam supports the filing of this case by the Philippines, 2) it rejects China's "nine-dashed line", and 3) it asks the arbitral tribunal to take note of Vietnam's claims on certain islands such as the Paracels.

Other stances
Brunei sent its own UNCLOS claim through a preliminary submission prior to the arbitration. In May 2009, Malaysia and Vietnam, as well as Vietnam alone, filed claims to the International Tribunal for the Law of the Sea with regard to the islands . This was in relation to extending their claimed continental shelves and Exclusive Economic Zones. The People's Republic of China rejected the claims since those violate the "nine-dotted line". The Philippines challenged the Malaysian claim stating that the claims overlap with the North Borneo dispute.

Indonesia made a comment on China's claim by saying that the features are rocks and cannot sustain life, effectively calling the Chinese claim invalid. The Philippines echoed Indonesia's claims, further stating that the islands belong to them through geographic proximity.

Arbitration
The arbitral tribunal convened a Hearing on Jurisdiction and Admissibility on 7 to 13 July 2015, rendered an Award on Jurisdiction and Admissibility on 29 October 2015, convened a hearing on the merits from 24 to 30 November 2015, and issued an inanimous award on 12 July 2016.

Hearings
On 7 July 2015, case hearings began with the Philippines asking the arbitral tribunal to invalidate China's claims. The hearings were also attended by observers from Indonesia, Japan, Malaysia, Thailand and Vietnam. The case has been compared to Nicaragua v. United States due to similarities of the parties involved such as that a developing country is challenging a permanent member of the United Nations Security Council in an arbitral tribunal.

On 29 October 2015, the tribunal ruled that it had the power to hear the case. It agreed to take up seven of the 15 submissions made by Manila, in particular whether Scarborough Shoal and low-tide areas like Mischief Reef can be considered islands. It set aside seven more pointed claims mainly accusing Beijing of acting unlawfully to be considered at the next hearing on the case's merits. It also told Manila to narrow down the scope of its final request that the judges order that "China shall desist from further unlawful claims and activities."

The tribunal scheduled the hearing on merits of the case from 24 to 30 November 2015.

Award on Jurisdiction and Admissibility 
On 29 October 2015, the PCA published the award by the arbitral tribunal on Jurisdiction and Admissibility for the case. The tribunal found that it has jurisdiction to consider the following seven Philippines' Submissions. (Each number is the Philippines' Submissions number.) The tribunal reserved consideration of its jurisdiction to rule on Nos. 1, 2, 5, 8, 9, 12, and 14.

No.3 Philippines'position that Scarborough Shoal is a rock under Article 121(3).
No.4 Philippines' position that Mischief Reef, Second Thomas Shoal, and Subi Reef are low tide elevations that do not generate entitlement to maritime zones.
No.6 Whether Gaven Reef and McKennan Reef (including Hughes Reef) are low-tide elevations "that do not generate any maritime entitlements of their own".
No.7 Whether Johnson Reef, Cuarteron Reef, and Fiery Cross Reef do or do not generate an entitlement to an exclusive economic zone or continental shelf.
No.10 "premised on [the] fact that China has unlawfully prevented Philippine fishermen from carrying out traditional fishing activities within the territorial sea of Scarborough Shoal."
No.11 "China's failure to protect and preserve the marine environment at these two shoals [Scarborough Shoal and Second Thomas Shoal]."
No.13 Philippines' protest against China's "purported law enforcement activities as violating the Convention on the International Regulations for the Prevention of Collisions at Sea and also violating UNCLOS".

The tribunal stated in the award that there are continuing disputes in all of the 15 submissions from the Philippines, but for submissions such as No.3, No.4, No.6 and No.7, no known claims from the Philippines prior to the initiation of this arbitration exist, and that China was not aware of (nor had previously opposed) such claims prior to the initiation of arbitration. For Submissions No.8 to No.14, the tribunal held the view that the lawfulness of China's maritime activities in the South China Sea is not related to sovereignty.

Award 
On 12 July 2016, the PCA published the award by the arbitral tribunal which it states is final and binding as set out in the convention. Conclusions expressed in the award included the following:
 Regarding the "Nine-Dash Line" and China's claim in the maritime areas of the South China Sea
 The [UNCLOS] Convention defines the scope of maritime entitlements in the South China Sea, which may not extend beyond the limits imposed therein.
 China's claims to historic rights, or other sovereign rights or jurisdiction, with respect to the maritime areas of the South China Sea encompassed by the relevant part of the 'nine-dash line' are contrary to the Convention and without lawful effect to the extent that they exceed the geographic and substantive limits of China's maritime entitlements under the Convention. The Convention superseded any historic rights or other sovereign rights or jurisdiction in excess of the limits imposed therein.
 Regarding the status of features as above/below water at high tide (Submissions no. 4 and 6)
 High-tide features: (a) Scarborough Shoal, (b) Cuarteron Reef, (c) Fiery Cross Reef, (d) Johnson Reef, (e) McKennan Reef, and (f) Gaven Reef (North).
 Low-tide elevations: (a) Hughes Reef, (b) Gaven Reef (South), (c) Subi Reef, (d) Mischief Reef, (e) Second Thomas Shoal.
 Hughes Reef lies within 12 nautical miles of the high-tide features on McKennan Reef and Sin Cowe Island, Gaven Reef (South) lies within 12 nautical miles of the high-tide features at Gaven Reef (North) and Namyit Island, and that Subi Reef lies within 12 nautical miles of the high-tide feature of Sandy Cay on the reefs to the west of Thitu.
 Regarding the status of features as rocks/islands (Submissions no. 3, 5, and 7)
 Scarborough Shoal contains, within the meaning of Article 121(1) of the Convention, naturally formed areas of land, surrounded by water, which are above water at high tide. However, under Article 121(3) of the Convention, the high-tide features at Scarborough Shoal are rocks that cannot sustain human habitation or economic life of their own and accordingly shall have no exclusive economic zone or continental shelf.
 Johnson Reef, Cuarteron Reef, and Fiery Cross Reef contain, within the meaning of Article 121(1) of the Convention, naturally formed areas of land, surrounded by water, which are above water at high tide. However, for purposes of Article 121(3) of the Convention, the high-tide features at Johnson Reef, Cuarteron Reef, and Fiery Cross Reef are rocks that cannot sustain human habitation or economic life of their own and accordingly shall have no exclusive economic zone or continental shelf.
 The high-tide features at Gaven Reef (North) and McKennan Reef are rocks that cannot sustain human habitation or economic life of their own and accordingly shall have no exclusive economic zone or continental shelf.
Mischief Reef and Second Thomas Shoal are both low-tide elevations that generate no maritime zones of their own [and] that none of the high-tide features in the Spratly Islands are capable of sustaining human habitation or an economic life of their own within the meaning of those terms in Article 121(3) of the Convention. All of the high-tide features in the Spratly Islands are therefore legally rocks for purposes of Article 121(3) and do not generate entitlements to an exclusive economic zone or continental shelf. There is, accordingly, no possible entitlement by China to any maritime zone in the area of either Mischief Reef or Second Thomas Shoal and no jurisdictional obstacle to the tribunal's consideration of the Philippines' Submission No. 5.
 Both Mischief Reef and Second Thomas Shoal are located within 200 nautical miles of the Philippines' coast on the island of Palawan and are located in an area that is not overlapped by the entitlements generated by any maritime feature claimed by China. It follows, therefore, that, as between the Philippines and China, Mischief Reef and Second Thomas Shoal form part of the exclusive economic zone and continental shelf of the Philippines.
 Regarding alleged interference with the Philippines' sovereign rights in its EEZ and continental shelf (Submission no. 8)
 China has, through the operation of its marine surveillance vessels with respect to M/V Veritas Voyager on 1 to 2 March 2011 breached Article 77 of the Convention with respect to the Philippines' sovereign rights over the non-living resources of its continental shelf in the area of Reed Bank [and] that China has, by promulgating its 2012 moratorium on fishing in the South China Sea, without exception for areas of the South China Sea falling within the exclusive economic zone of the Philippines and without limiting the moratorium to Chinese flagged vessels, breached Article 56 of the Convention with respect to the Philippines' sovereign rights over the living resources of its exclusive economic zone.
 Regarding alleged failure to prevent Chinese nationals from exploiting the Philippines' living resources (Submission no. 9)
 China has, through the operation of its marine surveillance vessels in tolerating and failing to exercise due diligence to prevent fishing by Chinese flagged vessels at Mischief Reef and Second Thomas Shoal in May 2013, failed to exhibit due regard for the Philippines' sovereign rights with respect to fisheries in its exclusive economic zone. Accordingly, China has breached its obligations under Article 58(3) of the Convention.
 Regarding China's actions in respect of traditional fishing at Scarborough Shoal (Submission no. 10)
China has, through the operation of its official vessels at Scarborough Shoal from May 2012 onwards, unlawfully prevented Filipino fishermen from engaging in traditional fishing at Scarborough Shoal.
 Regarding alleged failure to protect and preserve the marine environment (Submissions no. 11 and 12(B))
 China has, through its toleration and protection of, and failure to prevent Chinese fishing vessels engaging in harmful harvesting activities of endangered species at Scarborough Shoal, Second Thomas Shoal and other features in the Spratly Islands, breached Articles 192 and 194(5) of the Convention.
 China has, through its island-building activities at Cuarteron Reef, Fiery Cross Reef, Gaven Reef (North), Johnson Reef, Hughes Reef, Subi Reef and Mischief Reef, breached Articles 192, 194(1), 194(5), 197, 123, and 206 of the Convention.
Regarding occupation and construction activities on Mischief Reef (Submission no. 12)
China has, through its construction of installations and artificial islands at Mischief Reef without the authorisation of the Philippines, breached Articles 60 and 80 of the Convention with respect to the Philippines' sovereign rights in its exclusive economic zone and continental shelf [and], as a low-tide elevation, Mischief Reef is not capable of appropriation.
Regarding operation of law enforcement vessels in a dangerous manner (Submission no. 13)
China has, by virtue of the conduct of Chinese law enforcement vessels in the vicinity of Scarborough Shoal, created serious risk of collision and danger to Philippine vessels and personnel. The tribunal finds China to have violated Rules 2, 6, 7, 8, 15, and 16 of the COLREGS and, as a consequence, to be in breach of Article 94 of the Convention.
 Regarding aggravation or extension of the dispute between the parties (Submission No. 14)
 China has in the course of these proceedings aggravated and extended the disputes between the Parties through its dredging, artificial island-building, and construction activities [in several particulars itemised in the award].
 Regarding the future conduct of the parties (Submission no. 15)
 Both Parties are obliged to comply with the Convention, including its provisions regarding the resolution of disputes, and to respect the rights and freedoms of other States under the Convention. Neither Party contests this.

Timeline
 22 January 2013 – Philippines served China with notification and Statement of Claim
 19 February 2013 – China rejected the Philippines' Notification
 11 July 2013 – First meeting of the arbitral tribunal at The Hague
 31 July 2013 – Philippines commented on draft Rules of Procedure for the Tribunal
 1 August 2013 – China indicated that "it does not accept the arbitration initiated by the Philippines"
 27 August 2013 – Procedural Order No 1 issued via PCA Press Release on behalf of the arbitral tribunal
 30 March 2014 – Submission of the Philippines Memorial
 14–15 May 2014 – Second meeting of the arbitral tribunal at The Hague
 21 May 2014 – China comments on draft Procedural Order No 2 and observes that "it does not accept the arbitration initiated by the Philippines". 
 29 May 2014 – Philippines comments on draft Procedural Order No 2
 2 June 2014 – Procedural Order No 2 issued via PCA Press Release on behalf of the arbitral tribunal
 15 December 2014 – China had not filed a Counter-Memorial
 16 December 2014 – Procedural Order No 3 issued via PCA Press Release on behalf of the arbitral tribunal
 16 March 2015 – The Philippines made a Supplemental Written Submission to the Arbitral Tribunal
 20–21 April 2015 – Third meeting of the arbitral tribunal at The Hague
 21 April 2015 – Procedural Order No 4 issued via PCA Press Release on behalf of the arbitral tribunal
 7–13 July 2015 – Hearing of the arbitral tribunal at The Hague
 29 October 2015 – PCA issued award on jurisdiction and admissibility
 12 July 2016 – PCA issued award on merits

International reactions

Before the ruling
There are countries and multinational bodies that have expressed support or opposition to the Philippines' move to take the South China Sea dispute to the Permanent Court of Arbitration. These entities however may not necessarily support either sides when it comes to the ownership of the disputed area affected by the case.

National governments
Compiled from the Center for Strategic and International Studies, the Council of the EU and the European Council, and the Philippine Daily Inquirer

Support for the arbitration/Denial of PRC's claim 

 Opposed to arbitration

 No public confirmation of stance towards the arbitration

ASEAN

Within the Association of Southeast Asian Nations (ASEAN), Malaysia and Vietnam, who have territorial claims in the South China Sea, as well as Australia, Indonesia, Japan, Singapore and Thailand, sent observers to the proceedings.

In June 2016, before the tribunal issued its ruling, Malaysia's foreign ministry released what it said was a joint statement of ASEAN expressing "serious concern" over land reclamation activities in the South China Sea. Within hours of issuing the statement, Malaysia announced that ASEAN wanted the statement retracted for "urgent amendments". Malaysian Foreign Ministry's Secretary General Othman Hashim later claimed that ASEAN's foreign ministers had "unanimously agreed" to the statement at a meeting, and that "Subsequent developments pertaining to the media statement took place after the departure of the ASEAN foreign ministers".

Cambodian Prime Minister Hun Sen later gave a speech condemning reports that Cambodia had had the statement retracted in order to please China, saying, "Cambodia will not be a puppet of anyone on the South China Sea issue." Hun Sen suggested the case was a "political conspiracy" and that the ruling "will not be fair", but also said that "Cambodia will just choose to stay neutral on this issue." A few days after Hun Sen's speech, the Cambodian People's Party, which Hun Sen heads, issued a statement backing him. According to the statement, "The CPP would like to reject unjust allegations that Cambodia has destroyed the issuing of a joint statement from ASEAN on the issue of the South China Sea both in Kunming recently and in 2012".

On 9 July, shortly before the tribunal issued its verdict, Cambodia's foreign ministry issued a statement reiterating that Cambodia would not join any ASEAN statement on the verdict.

Australia
Australia has not sought to take a public position on the matter other than to state that the ruling of the tribunal should be respected. However, Australia has recognised the right of the Philippines to seek arbitration.

European Union
European Union encourages all parties to seek peaceful solutions, through dialogue and cooperation, in accordance with international law – in particular with the UN Convention on the Law of the Sea. A foreign affairs of the EU issued a statement saying "Whilst not taking a position on claims, the EU is committed to a maritime order based upon the principles of international law, in particular as reflected in the United Nations Convention on the law of the Sea (UNCLOS),". The EU later stressed that China should respect the ruling from the Hague.

Group of Seven 
The Group of 7 (Canada, France, Germany, Italy, Japan, the United Kingdom, and the United States as well as a representation from the European Union) made a statement that the bloc should issue a "clear signal" to China's overlapping claims.
European Council President Donald Tusk said on the sidelines of a summit in Ise-Shima that the bloc should take a "clear and tough stance" on China's contested maritime claims.

India
In August 2015, a junior Minister of State of India, V K Singh, told that territorial disputes should be resolved through peaceful means as was done by India and Bangladesh using the mechanisms provided by the UNCLOS, and parties should abide by the Declaration of the Conduct of Parties in the South China Sea. In October 2015, the Foreign Minister of India Sushma Swaraj stated in a joint statement that India supports a peaceful settlement of the dispute. Peaceful means should be used according to the principles of international law, including the UNCLOS. In April 2016, Foreign Minister Sushma Swaraj stated in a communique that Russia, India and China agreed to maintain legal order of seas based on international law, including the UNCLOS, and all related disputes should be addressed through negotiations and agreements between the parties concerned.

New Zealand

The foreign secretary of New Zealand stated in a speech that New Zealand supports the right to seek arbitration on South China Sea disputes.

North Atlantic Treaty Organization
NATO General Petr Pavel said NATO has "no legal platform" to intervene militarily in the South China Sea territorial disputes, and NATO will not interfere in other region's issues. NATO supports any regional solutions based on political and diplomatic negotiations, "rules-based international system" and peaceful means for resolving discord.

People's Republic of China
On 14 April 2016, the Fijian government issued a statement to correct a previous media release by China and stated that the Fijian government did not support China's proposition.

In May 2016, Chinese Foreign Ministry spokesperson Hua Chunying said that more than 40 countries had expressed their support for China's position. One 19 May 2016, Foreign Ministry spokesperson Hong Lei stated that Brunei, Mozambique, and Slovenia supported China's stance for negotiations to resolve South China Sea issues. In July 2016, it was reported that more than 70 countries had called for the South China Sea dispute to be resolved through negotiations, not arbitration, although American media and think tanks have expressed doubt, with the Center for Strategic and International Studies (CSIS) via its Asia Maritime Transparency Initiative (AMTI) putting the number at ten.

Shanghai Cooperation Organisation
In a statement of the Shanghai Cooperation Organisation Secretary-General Rashid Olimov on South China Sea issue, all SCO countries agreed and supported China's efforts made to safeguard peace and stability in the South China Sea. Directly concerned states should resolve disputes through negotiation and consultation in accordance with all bilateral treaties and the Declaration on the Conduct of Parties in the South China Sea (DOC), the statement said. It urged to respect the right of every sovereign state to decide by itself the dispute resolution methods, and strongly opposed outsiders' intervention into the South China Sea issue, as well as the attempt to internationalise the dispute.

South Korea
During the 2015 East Asia Summit, South Korea's President Park Geun-hye stated that concerned parties should observe the Declaration on the Conduct of Parties in the South China Sea and that disputes should be resolved according to international law. "Korea has consistently stressed that the dispute must be peacefully resolved according to international agreements and code of conduct" and "China must guarantee the right of free navigation and flight. The Asahi Shimbun reports that the United States has made an unofficial request to South Korea to express its position on the arbitration case before the ruling but South Korea reportedly turned down the request saying its difficult make a position prior to the ruling.

After the ruling

National governments
Compiled from the Center for Strategic and International Studies, the Council of the EU and the European Council, and ASEAN

Supported ruling to be respected

Positively acknowledged ruling without any calls for compliance

Neutral

Opposed ruling

Statements from National governments
 : On 15 July 2016, Australian Minister for Defence, Marise Payne, and Minister for Foreign Affairs, Julie Bishop, stated that they regard the ruling "as final, and as binding", and urged all parties involved in the dispute to "abide by the ruling." The ministers also further described the court's ruling as "consistent" with the Australia's position on the matter.
 : On 21 July 2016, Canadian Minister of Foreign Affairs, Stéphane Dion stated "Whether one agrees or not with the ruling, Canada believes that parties should comply with it. All parties should seize this opportunity as a stepping stone to renewed efforts to peacefully manage and resolve their disputes, in accordance with international law. Dion reiterated Canada's commitment to "the maintenance of international law and to an international rules-based order for the oceans and seas" to resolve the dispute. He also added " We are deeply concerned about regional tensions that have been escalating for a number of years and have the potential to undermine peace and stability. It is essential that all states in the region exercise restraint and avoid coercion and actions that will escalate tension".
 : On 12 July 2016, China stated that it will not accept the ruling. According to the Chinese Ministry of Foreign Affairs, it states "With regard to the award rendered on 12 July 2016 by the Arbitral Tribunal in the South China Sea arbitration established at the unilateral request of the Republic of the Philippines (hereinafter referred to as the "Arbitral Tribunal"), the Ministry of Foreign Affairs of China solemnly declares that the award is null and void and has no binding force. China neither accepts nor recognises it." Xi Jinping, paramount leader of China stated that China's "territorial sovereignty and marine rights" in the seas would not be affected by the ruling. He also stated that China was still committed to resolving the dispute with its neighbours.
 : On 12 July 2016, Indian ministry of external affairs stated that the country supports freedom of navigation, and urged all parties to demonstrate an utmost respect for the UNCLOS.
 : On 13 July 2016, Indonesia called on all parties involved in the territorial dispute to exercise self-restraint and to respect applicable international laws.
 : On 16 July 2016, Japan stated that the arbitration court's ruling "is legally binding and must be respected by all parties," thus urged Beijing to respect and comply the ruling.
 : On 13 July 2016, Malaysia called for parties involved to exercise self-restraint to avoid escalating tension. The country Foreign Ministry said in a statement that "It is important to maintain peace, security and stability through the exercise of self-restraint in the conduct of activities that may further complicate disputes or escalate tension and avoid the threat or use of force in the South China Sea".
 : On 12 July 2016, Singapore urged that all parties involved in the South China Sea dispute to respect the legal and diplomatic processes.
 : On 13 July 2016, South Korea stated that the country supports freedom of navigation and overflight in South China Sea, and support the peaceful means in resolving dispute according to international law.
 : On 12 July 2016, Vietnam immediately welcomed the arbitration tribunal ruling, thus announced that the country supports peace and order, also freedom of navigation and overflight in the region.

United Nations
The United Nations says it has no position regarding either legal merits or procedural merits of the case.

The UN's International Court of Justice says it has no involvement in the case either.

ASEAN
On 25 July 2016, in Vientiane, Laos, ASEAN issued the joint statement regarding the South China Sea disputeː ensure and promote the peace, stability, and security in the region.

The 36th ASEAN Summit was held virtually on 26 June 2020. Vietnam, as the Chairman of the Summit, released the Chairman's Statement. The Statement said the United Nations Convention on the Law of the Sea is “the basis for determining maritime entitlements, sovereign rights, jurisdiction and legitimate interests over maritime zones, and the 1982 UNCLOS sets out the legal framework within which all activities in the oceans and seas must be carried out.”

Other reactions
The ruling was followed on 29 July by derogatory messages against the Philippines and Vietnam posted on Vietnamese computer systems by self-proclaimed Chinese hackers.

Academic Graham Allison observed in 2016, "None of the five permanent members of the UN Security Council have ever accepted any international court's ruling when (in their view) it infringed their sovereignty or national security interests. Thus, when China rejects the Court's decision in this case, it will be doing just what the other great powers have repeatedly done for decades."

In August 2016, hackers linked to the Chinese government infiltrated and extracted confidential information from the Philippines' Department of Justice and the international legal firm which had represented the Philippines at the Hague. Related attacks also occurred in July 2016.

The Asia correspondent of The Globe and Mail feels that the Philippines have not enforced the international court judgment over the South China Sea because of massive investment and aid from China into the Philippines after the judgment was released. It was remarked by Justin Trudeau in a 2019 election leadership debate that the pacification was accomplished through the Chinese-led Asian Infrastructure Investment Bank.

On 22 September 2020, in UN Speech, the Philippine President, Rodrigo Duterte reaffirmed the Hague ruling rejecting most of China's claims to disputed waters, and said “The award is now part of international law, beyond compromise and beyond the reach of passing governments to dilute, diminish, or abandon.”

Developments during the term of Philippines President Duterte
Seeking to avoid armed conflict, President Duterte adopted a conciliatory and friendly stance towards China that was unlike his predecessor's antagonism toward it. In 2016, Duterte and Chinese president Xi Jinping created the biannual Bilateral Consultation Mechanism on the South China Sea, a process allowing the two nations to peacefully manage disputes and strengthen their relations. In May 2017, Duterte said Xi had threatened war if the Philippines tried to enforce the South China Sea Arbitration ruling and drill for oil in the West Philippine Sea.

Duterte also hoped a non-confrontational approach to China would eventually lead to joint exploration of the West Philippine Sea to support Build! Build! Build!. During Xi's first state visit to the country in November 2018, the Philippines and China signed 29 agreements, including cooperation on the Belt and Road Initiative and a memorandum of understanding on joint oil-and-gas developments in the West Philippine Sea. In September 2019, Duterte said Xi had offered the Philippines a controlling stake in a gas deal in the Reed Bank if the Philippines set aside the South China Sea Arbitration ruling.

In April 2017, Duterte ordered the Armed Forces of the Philippines to occupy and fortify several uninhabited islands in the South China Sea. Following the sighting of Chinese survey vessels, he ordered the Philippine Navy to build structures on Benham Rise to assert the Philippines' sovereignty over the region. A month later, he signed an executive order formally renaming Benham Rise to Philippine Rise.

Chinese aggression in the South China Sea strained the nations' relationship. In April 2017, Chinese Ambassador to the Philippines Zhao Jianhua called Philippine plans to repair Thitu (Pag-asa) Island illegal. Between 2018 and 2020, China deployed hundreds of military vessels around Thitu Island to impede these repairs. In April 2019, following a military report at least 275 Chinese vessels had been monitoring the region since January, Duterte threatened to send Philippine soldiers on a "suicide mission" should China further encroach. In January 2021, China passed a law authorizing its coast guard to fire on foreign vessels as needed and in March, it moored 220 Chinese vessels believed to be manned by the Chinese military at disputed Whitsun Reef. In response, Duterte authorized foreign-affairs secretary Teodoro Locsin Jr. to submit several diplomatic protests.

By June 2020, Duterte was gradually distancing the Philippines from China. In July that year, he called on the Department of Foreign Affairs to demand China recognize the South China Sea Arbitration ruling. During the 75th United Nations General Assembly in September 2020, Duterte made one of his most vocal defenses of the Philippine victory in the arbitration case:

In March 2022, Duterte warned trouble might occur if the next Philippine administration chose not to honor the memorandum of understanding with China on joint-exploration activities in the West Philippine Sea, after receiving a "reminder" from a man from China whom he did not identify. On June 24, six days before his term ended, Duterte ordered the complete termination of the planned joint oil exploration in the West Philippine Sea with China; Locsin stated in the three years since it was signed, the "objective of developing oil and gas resources so critical for the Philippines" had not been achieved.

See also 

 Baselines of the Chinese territorial sea
 Baselines of the Philippines
 Territorial disputes in the South China Sea
 Scarborough Shoal standoff
 Great Wall of Sand
 Island Chain Strategy
 First island chain
 East Asian foreign policy of the Barack Obama administration
 Nicaragua v. United States
 Mauritius v. United Kingdom
 List of irredentist claims or disputes

References

Citations

Further reading 
 Harriet Moynihan (2017) China's Evolving Approach to International Dispute Settlement, Chatham House

External links 
 

2013 in law
2013 in China
2013 in the Philippines
South China Sea
Law of the sea
China–Philippines relations
Permanent Court of Arbitration cases
Energy law
History of the Philippines (1986–present)
2016 in law
2016 in the Philippines
2016 in China
Xi Jinping
Presidency of Benigno Aquino III
Presidency of Rodrigo Duterte